Shakatak is an English jazz-funk band founded in 1980 by Nigel Wright and former Wigan Casino DJ Kev Roberts. Following an initial white label release, "Steppin", the band's name was derived from a record store in Soho, London Record Shack. It was they who first showed interest in the initial single.

Shakatak scored a number of chart entries, including two Top 10 hits in the UK Singles Chart, "Night Birds" (1982) and "Down on the Street" (1984), plus a further 12 entries in the Guinness Book of British Hit Singles. The group is still active and popular throughout the world, particularly in Japan and the Far East, and generally produce a new album every two years on JVC Records.

From their first release in August 1980 (the Bill Sharpe composition "Steppin'" on the Polydor record label), and their first 1981 album, Drivin' Hard, the band's singles and albums have entered the charts regularly.

Career
It was the release of the 1981 single "Easier Said Than Done" that gave the band the radio exposure needed for their first top-twenty hit. This record introduced their instrumental-unison vocal sound to a much wider audience, and the track stayed in the UK Singles Chart for seventeen weeks.  The follow-up, "Night Birds" (1982), was their first single to reach the top ten and it also peaked in Australia at number 92. The album of the same name gave Shakatak their first gold album, entering at number four and remaining in the charts for twenty-eight weeks. By now a major international act, the success of the release gave them the number-one jazz album slot in Japan, and attracted interest across Europe and South America. "Night Birds" was used in the 2009 feature film Away We Go, directed by Sam Mendes, and was used as the demonstration song on many Casio piano keyboards such as the Casio CT-460.

Two more albums – Invitations and Out of This World – were recorded in 1982 and 1983, resulting in several more chart hits, and paving the way for the next major breakthrough in the band's career. With a subtle change in musical direction, yet still retaining the band's identity, Jill Saward (formerly of Fusion Orchestra, Brandy and Citizen Gang) became their sole lead singer to make Shakatak's fifth album, Down on the Street (1984). The resulting single releases "Down on the Street" and "Watching You" had great success, and brought them attention in new parts of the world. The following year saw the release of the group's second live album, Live! (1985), which was recorded in both Tokyo and London.

In 1988, Shakatak were commissioned to write the official song for the 1988 Kenwood Cup yacht race entitled "Racing with the Wind" which was used in Japanese Kenwood advertisements and was released on an album called Da Makani (1988) exclusively released in Japan.

However, following this success the band felt it was time that they re-directed their efforts back to singles and an album for release to the rest of the world. The result was "Something Special" (1987), closely followed by the night club and chart hit "Mr Manic & Sister Cool" from their next LP, Manic & Cool (1988).

In the 1990s, the band achieved success in the US when two of their albums went to No 1 in the contemporary jazz charts and were also awarded the Japanese Grammy for best international instrumental album six years running.

Shakatak continue to appear regularly throughout the world with recent festival performances at Jakjazz, the Jakarta International Java Jazz Festival, Bangkok Jazz Festival, Hua Hin Jazz Festival and the Bratislava Jazz Days.  They make annual appearances at the Billboard Clubs in Japan, and the Pizza Express Jazz Room in London, plus numerous other concert and club performances.

The band celebrated their thirtieth anniversary year in 2010.

Bassist George Anderson released his second solo album, Expressions, on 3 September 2012 through Secret Records. Coming three years after his first 2009 album Positivity, this album again had Anderson writing, arranging and producing all of the tracks.

Keyboardist Bill Sharpe worked with American jazz pianist Don Grusin on a joint project called Geography released in 2007. Sharpe's second collaboration with Grusin, Trans Atlantica, was released on 3 September 2012. It was also issued through Secret Records, and included Geography as a special 2-CD package.

Drummer Roger Odell has released three albums with his band Roger Odell's Beatifik: The Blue Window (2000, Passion Jazz), Intrigue (15 November 2015, Secret Records) and The Long Drive Home (2019, Secret Records as Beatifik). These albums feature Jacqui Hicks (lead vocals), saxophonist Mornington Lockett as well as Roger's wife Larraine Odell (vocals) and son Jamie Odell a.k.a. Jimpster (keyboards, vocals, producer).

To celebrate their fortieth anniversary year in 2020, the 3-CD and DVD box set All Around The World 40th Anniversary was released through Secret Records.

Personnel

Current members
 Jill Saward – vocals, percussion, flute (1980–present)
 Bill Sharpe – keyboards (1980–present)
 Roger Odell – drums (1980–present)
 George Anderson – bass (1981–present)

Touring musicians
 Alan Wormald – guitar
 Jacqui Hicks – backing vocals, sax & flute
 Debby Bracknell – backing vocals, flute
 Malcolm MacFarlane – guitar

Former members
 Keith Winter – electric guitar (1980–1989)
 Jackie Rawe – vocals (1980–1983)
 Nigel Wright – keyboards (1980–1982)
 Steve Underwood – bass guitar (1980–1981)
 Tracy Ackerman – vocals (1980s–1990s)
 Lorna Bannon – vocals (1982)
 Norma Lewis – vocals (1983)
 Friðrik Karlsson – electric guitar (1990s–2000s)

In studio 
 Dick Morrisey – saxophone
 Mornington Lockett – saxophone
 Derek Nash – saxophone
 Fridrik Karlsson – guitar
 Roberto Tola – guitar
 Kazumi Watanabe – guitar

Discography

References

External links

 Shakatak official website
 Shakatak biography by Jason Ankeny, discography and album reviews, credits & releases at AllMusic
 Shakatak discography, album releases & credits at Discogs
 Shakatak albums to be listened as stream on Spotify

English boogie musicians
English funk musical groups
English jazz ensembles
Jazz fusion ensembles
British post-disco music groups
Smooth jazz ensembles
Crossover (music)